Kharghar is the fourth railway station from   on the Harbour Line of the Mumbai Suburban Railway network.

It takes about 65 minutes to reach Kharghar by suburban train from Chhatrapati Shivaji Terminus. A new broad-gauge line will connect Kharghar to  via . The line connecting to Karjat will be completed in 2019.

Railway stations in Raigad district
Mumbai Suburban Railway stations
Mumbai CR railway division